The Pacific Islanders was a combined international rugby union team that played from 2004 to 2008. It represented Fiji, Samoa and Tonga; Niue and the Cook Islands also supplied players to the squad for their tour in 2004. The team did not play at Rugby World Cups, where each of the nations continued to represent themselves.

History

Australia/New Zealand 2004
The Pacific Islands Rugby Alliance (PIRA) was formed in 2003. The coach is appointed by the Islanders board and in turn supported by the national coaches of Fiji, Samoa and Tonga. Its team, the Pacific Islanders, is drawn from the best Fijian, Tongan and Samoan players, and created great interest in their inaugural 2004 tour. They lost every game, 29-14 v Australia, 41-26 v New Zealand and 38-24 v South Africa. The Islanders did beat a Queensland XV 48-29 at Ballymore and NSW Waratahs 68-21 at Australia Stadium.

Celtic Nations 2006

As the individual nations were primarily concerned with qualifying for the next World Cup the Islanders did not tour again until 2006. Scheduled matches against Italy and New Zealand in June 2006 did not take place, but they undertook a Northern Hemisphere tour in late 2006 with matches against Scotland, Wales and Ireland. PIRA had ruled in July 2006 that the team selected for that year's tour to Great Britain and Ireland would consist only of players who had previously played for Fiji, Manu Samoa or Tonga. This was intended to ensure that the Pacific Islanders team serves to develop players for the island nations only. Notably, two players on the 2004 tour, Sione Lauaki and Sitiveni Sivivatu (the latter the Islanders' leading scorer on that tour), went on to play for New Zealand. The Pacific Islanders were beaten in all three matches.

Europe 2008
In November 2008, the team toured Europe and played Tests against England, France and Italy. The team's manager was Major-General Sitiveni Rabuka, former Prime Minister of Fiji and author of two military coups in 1987. Though it began with two defeats, the tour ended with the Islanders' first ever win over European opposition, with a 25-17 victory in Italy.

Alliance ends in 2009
In July 2009, the Samoa Rugby Union informed fellow Alliance members Fiji and Tonga that it had decided to quit the alliance because the merged Pacific Island team had failed to produce financial benefits sought by member unions.

Future status

There was speculation that the Islanders would be admitted into an expanded Super 12 competition or the Tri Nations Series, but instead the organisers of the Super 12 and the Tri Nations, SANZAR, opted to expand the Super 14 by adding one team each in Australia and South Africa and an extra round of fixtures to the Tri Nations without admitting any new teams. French businessman Eric Series, owner of the Asia Pacific Dragons team, proposed a Pacific Islands team for the 2016 Super Rugby season but was outbid by the Japan Rugby Football Union.

In 2014, a match between the Pacific Islanders and the British & Irish Lions was proposed for the 2017 British & Irish Lions tour to New Zealand, but the match was never scheduled.

Squad

Two further players were originally included in the squad Sireli Bobo and Soane Tonga'uiha. However Bobo became unavailable, and Tonga'uiha later withdrew from the tour.

Results

2004

Australia: 15.Joe Roff, 14.Clyde Rathbone, 13.Stirling Mortlock, 12.Matt Giteau, 11.Lote Tuqiri, 10.Stephen Larkham, 9.George Gregan (capt), 8.David Lyons, 7.Phil Waugh, 6.Radike Samo, 5.Nathan Sharpe, 4.Justin Harrison, 3.Al Baxter, 2.Brendan Cannon, 1.Bill Young,  - replacements: 16.Jeremy Paul, 17.Nic Henderson, 18.Dan Vickerman , 19.George Smith, 20.Chris Whitaker, 21.Matt Burke, 22.Chris Latham 
Pacific Islanders: 15.Norman Ligairi, 14.Lome Fa'atau, 13.Seilala Mapusua, 12.Seremaia Baikeinuku, 11.Sitiveni Sivivatu, 10.Tanner Vili, 9.Moses Rauluni, 8.Alifereti Doviverata, 7.Sisa Koyamaibole, 6.Sione Lauaki, 5.Ifereimi Rawaqa, 4.Inoke Afeaki (capt), 3.Taufa'ao Filise, 2.Aleki Lutui, 1.Soane Tonga'uiha,  - replacements: 17.Tevita Taumoepeau, 18.Leo Lafaiali'i, 19.Semo Sititi, 20.Steve So'oialo, 21.Seru Rabeni, 22.Sireli Bobo    -  No entry: 16.Joeli Lotawa

New Zealand: 15.Mils Muliaina, 14.Rico Gear, 13.Tana Umaga (capt.), 12.Dan Carter, 11.Joe Rokocoko, 10.Carlos Spencer, 9.Justin Marshall, 8.Xavier Rush, 7.Marty Holah, 6.Jono Gibbes, 5.Keith Robinson, 4.Chris Jack, 3.Carl Hayman, 2.Keven Mealamu, 1.Kees Meeuws,  - replacements: 18.Jerry Collins, 20.Byron Kelleher, 21.Nick Evans       -  No entry : 16.Andrew Hore, 17.Greg Somerville, 19.Mose Tuiali'i, 22.Sam Tuitupou
Pacific Islanders: 15.Seru Rabeni, 14.Lome Fa'atau, 13.Brian Lima, 12.Seremaia Baikeinuku, 11.Sitiveni Sivivatu, 10.Tanner Vili, 9.Moses Rauluni, 8.Sisa Koyamaibole, 7.Alifereti Doviverata, 6.Sione Lauaki, 5.Ifereimi Rawaqa, 4.Inoke Afeaki (capt.), 3.Taufa'ao Filise, 2.Aleki Lutui, 1.Soane Tonga'uiha,  - replacements: 17.Tevita Taumoepeau, 18.Filipo Levi, 19.Semo Sititi, 19.Semo Sititi, 21.Tane Tu'ipulotu, 22.Sireli Bobo    -  No entry: 16.Joeli Lotawa, 20.Steve So'oialo

South Africa: 15.Percy Montgomery, 14.Breyton Paulse, 13.Marius Joubert, 12.De Wet Barry, 11.Jean de Villiers, 10.Jaco van der Westhuyzen, 9.Bolla Conradie, 8.Jacques Cronjé, 7.AJ Venter, 6.Schalk Burger, 5.Gerrie Britz, 4.Bakkies Botha, 3.Eddie Andrews, 2.John Smit  (capt.), 1.Os du Randt,  - replacements: 17.CJ van der Linde, 18.Quinton Davids, 19.Pedrie Wannenburg, 20.Fourie du Preez      -  No entry : 16.Danie Coetzee, 21.Brent Russell, 22.Gaffie du Toit
Pacific Islanders: 15.Norman Ligairi, 14.Sireli Bobo, 13.Seilala Mapusua, 12.Seru Rabeni, 11.Sitiveni Sivivatu, 10.Tanner Vili, 9.Moses Rauluni, 8.Sisa Koyamaibole, 7.Alifereti Doviverata, 6.Sione Lauaki, 5.Ifereimi Rawaqa, 4.Inoke Afeaki (capt.), 3.Tevita Taumoepeau, 2.Aleki Lutui, 1.Soane Tonga'uiha,  - replacements: 16.Joeli Lotawa, 17.Taufa'ao Filise, 18.Filipo Levi, 19.Tu Tamarua, 20.Steve So'oialo, 21.Seremaia Baikeinuku, 22.Brian Lima

2006

2008

See also 
 Pacific Islands Rugby Alliance
 Moana Pasifika
 Fiji national rugby team
 Samoa national rugby team
 Tonga national rugby team

References

External links 

Union websites
 Fiji
 Samoa
 Tonga

 
International rugby union teams
Multinational rugby union teams
Rugby union in Oceania
2004 establishments in Oceania